In the mathematical discipline of graph theory the Tutte theorem, named after William Thomas Tutte, is a characterization of finite graphs with perfect matchings. It is a generalization of Hall's marriage theorem from bipartite to arbitrary graphs. It is a special case of the Tutte–Berge formula.

Intuition 
Our goal is to characterize all graphs that do not have a perfect matching. Let us start with the most obvious case of a graph without a perfect matching: a graph with an odd number of vertices. In such a graph, any matching leaves at least one unmatched vertex, so it cannot be perfect. 

A slightly more general case is a disconnected graph in which one or more components have an odd number of vertices (even if the total number of vertices is even). Let us call such components odd components. In any matching, each vertex can only be matched to vertices in the same component. Therefore, any matching leaves at least one unmatched vertex in every odd component, so it cannot be perfect.

Next, consider a graph G with a vertex u such that, if we remove from G the vertex u and its adjacent edges, the remaining graph (denoted ) has two or more odd components. As above, any matching leaves, in every odd component, at least one vertex that is unmatched to other vertices in the same component. Such a vertex can only be matched to u. But since there are two or more unmatched vertices, and only one of them can be matched to u, at least one other vertex remains unmatched, so the matching is not perfect.

We have arrived at a necessary condition: if G has a perfect matching, then for every vertex subset  in G, the graph  has at most  odd components.

Tutte's theorem says that this condition is both necessary and sufficient for the existence of perfect matching.

Tutte's theorem 

Proof

First we write the condition:

Necessity of (∗): Consider a graph , with a perfect matching. Delete . Since each vertex in  can be in this relation with at most one connected component (because of it being matched at most once in a perfect matching), .

Sufficiency of (∗): Let  be an arbitrary graph with no perfect matching. We will find a Tutte violator, that is, a subset  of  such that . We can suppose that  is edge-maximal, i.e.,  has a perfect matching for every edge  not present in  already.

We define  to be the set of vertices with degree .

Since , there exists a vertex  such that .

How can  end?

In this case we define .

Equivalence to the Tutte-Berge formula 
The Tutte–Berge formula says that the size of a maximum matching of a graph  equals . Equivalently, the number of unmatched vertices in a maximum matching equals .

Since any set  which separates  into more than  components must contain all the new vertices, (*) is satisfied for  if and only if .

In infinite graphs
For connected infinite graphs that are locally finite (every vertex has finite degree), a generalization of Tutte's condition holds: such graphs have perfect matchings if and only if there is no finite subset, the removal of which creates a number of finite odd components larger than the size of the subset.

See also 
 Bipartite matching
 Hall's marriage theorem
 Petersen's theorem

External links 

 Sunil Chandran, Tutte's theorem on existence of a perfect matching (in YouTube).
 Derive Hall's theorem from Tutte's theorem (in Math StackExchange).

Notes

References
 
 

Matching (graph theory)
Theorems in graph theory
Articles containing proofs